Spirit Lake Township is one of twelve townships in Dickinson County, Iowa, USA.  As of the 2000 census, its population was 1,467.

History
Spirit Lake Township was formed in 1859.

Geography
According to the United States Census Bureau, Spirit Lake Township covers an area of 28.9 square miles (74.86 square kilometers); of this, 19.01 square miles (49.23 square kilometers, 65.76 percent) is land and 9.9 square miles (25.63 square kilometers, 34.24 percent) is water.

Cities, towns, villages
 Orleans
 Spirit Lake (partial)

Adjacent townships
 Superior Township (east)
 Richland Township (southeast)
 Center Grove Township (south)
 Lakeville Township (southwest)
 Diamond Lake Township (west)

Cemeteries
The township contains Saint Margaret Cemetery.

Lakes
 Center Lake
 East Okoboji Lake
 Hottes Lake
 Little Spirit Lake
 Marble Lake
 Spirit Lake
 Sunken Lake

Landmarks
 Mini Wakan State Park

School districts
 Spirit Lake Community School District

Political districts
 Iowa's 5th congressional district
 State House District 06
 State Senate District 03

References
 United States Census Bureau 2007 TIGER/Line Shapefiles
 United States Board on Geographic Names (GNIS)
 United States National Atlas

External links

 
US-Counties.com
City-Data.com

Townships in Dickinson County, Iowa
Townships in Iowa
1859 establishments in Iowa
Populated places established in 1859